Tayy al-Arḍ ( "folding up of the earth" or "covering long distances in the twinkling of an eye") is the name for thaumaturgical teleportation in the mystical form of Islamic religious and philosophical tradition. The concept has been expressed as "traversing the earth without moving"; some have termed it "moving by the earth being displaced under one's feet". It is a concept widely familiar to the Shī‘īs and Sufis, each group having a different interpretation on it.

Definitions and discussion
The dictionary of Dehkhoda defines Tay al-Ard as:

"نوعی کرامت که بجای گام برداشتن و رفتن, زمین در زیر پای آدمی بتندی پیچیده شود و او به مقصد خویش هر چند دور باشد در مدتی بسیار کم رسد" 

"A type of keramat in which instead of moving toward a destination by taking a step forward, the earth turns toward the traverser rapidly, no matter how far the destination be."

Ibn al-Nadim defines it exactly the same way when he says:

"و یذکر ان الارض تطوی له (میمون القداح) فیمضی الی این احب فی اقرب مده" 

The concept of tei al-ardh has its roots in the following verses of the Chapter al-Naml of the Quran:

The phrase "twinkling of an eye" is translated to mean in a very, very short time, i.e. almost instantaneously.

Some claim that according to these verses, it is the non-prophet Asif ibn al-Birkhia who transports the throne of Queen Sheba almost instantaneously. According to them, a hadith by Imam Ja'far al-Sadiq also confirms that Solomon transports the throne by Tay al-Ard in specific.

A precise definition of Tai al-Ardh has been offered by Allama Qadhi, one of the masters of Allameh Tabatabaei:

اعدام جسم و بدن در مكان اوّل، و احضار و ايجادش در مكان مقصود 

"the ceasing and termination of matter in the initial location, and its appearance and re-creation in its final location (destination)"

Other explanations offered are also mystical in nature. A hadith by Imam Muhammad al-Baqir e.g. is narrated in which he attributes the aforementioned esoteric knowledge of Asif ibn Barakhia to the Asma 'ullah or the "names of God", another widely discussed topic in Islamic philosophy and mysticism and even kabbalah:

"اسم اعظم خداوند، هفتاد و سه حرف است. آصف بن برخیا فقط یکی از آن حروف را میدانست که توانست زمین را درهم نوردد و قبل از یک چشم بر هم زدن، تخت بلیقس را از سرزمین سبا نزد سلیمان حاضر سازد؛ و ما ائمّه معصومین هفتاد و دو حرف از آن را میدانیم. یک حرف را هم خداوند به خودش اختصاص داده و تنها نزد اوست" 

"The Almighty's greatest name has 73 letters (or parts). Asif ibn Barakhia knew only one letter of it, which enabled him to traverse the earth in the blink of an eye. We Shia Imams however possess 72 of them. And the last letter is concealed from all creation and remains a secret to only the Almighty Himself."

Being an allegedly esoteric knowledge by nature, it is not known exactly how it takes place, but theories and explanations abound. The most prevalent theory has to do with the concept of consciousness and will (اراده). The person wills to be some place, and he is then simply there an instant later. This view can perhaps be understood from the perspective of Western philosophical idealism, where esse est percipi: if space does not have an objective reality, and reality itself is thought of as observer-based and a subjective entity, then ideas such as moving in space without actually physically moving are no longer uncharted possibilities.

In addition, the jinn are believed to possess this knowledge of transportation, however in a limited amount, as is evident again from the aforementioned Quranic verses.

History
Famous Sheikhs, Imams, and prominent figures in Islam, such as Abusaeid Abolkheir or Rumi or Al-Khidr, were believed to possess keramat, and writings from medieval Islam are full of stories and reports of certain individuals possessing such a trait. For example, Idries Shah and Robert Graves mention the case where senior members of the Azimia order were "reputed to appear, like many of the ancient Sheikhs at different places at one and the same time". Many other examples can be found in Attar's Tadhkirat al-Awliya (Biographies of the Saints) or the works of Ibn Arabi, as well as other similar chronicles. However, no one for sure has known the number and identity of all those who possess such knowledge, since according to Hujviri, those who hold such knowledge "do not know one another, and are not aware of the other's state of excellence, and are hidden from themselves and from mankind."

One of the most discussed phenomena of this supposedly esoteric knowledge is the event of traveling without actually moving (طی الارض). Islamic texts and records (from the mystics) are full of such accounts from various eras. For example, Bayazid Bastami has many such accounts, colored with mystical flavors, surrounding his life. In one account, he was asked, "They say you walk on water?" "A piece of wood can do that too," he replied. "They say you travel to Mecca at night and return by dawn?" he was asked. "But a bird at flight can do that too" was his answer. "So what is the meaning of being human?" he was asked. "A human is he who does not fasten his heart to anything but God" came his reply. In all such and similar accounts, a certain individual of unusually high rank (a Sheikh, Pir, or Imam) is seen to have the ability to travel long distances in almost instantaneous amounts of time.

Views

Sunni view
Belief in the possibility of such charismata Karamat by saints [Arabic: awliya] (Sufi shaykhs) is a part of classical orthodox Sunni doctrine [aqeedah] as, for example, listed in the Creed of Imam Tahawi (Aqidah Tahawiyyah) and all other orthodox Sunni treatises on religious doctrine and has been accepted as such since the earliest times of Islam.

Tay al-Ard is one term used for this concept by the Sufi shaykhs (Sufism being the spiritual aspect of Sunni Islam). Some Sufis call the concept tay al-makan ("folding of space"), the word makan ("location") being used as a synonym for the word ardh ("earth"). Both words are Arabic in origin, and both words are part of the Persian lexicon as well.

Shi'a view
The concept of Tay al-Ard also appears in Shia text such as the Usul-i Kafi. Shi'a particularly use the concept in the above Qur'anic verse in Shi'a-Sunni argumentations when accusations of over-meriting the Shi'a Imams are made. It is argued that if a non-prophet could teleport the throne, then it should present no theological objections against the belief that a Shi'a Imam, such as Imam Ali, might be able to do the same. Imam Mahdi is widely believed to have a broad arsenal of karamat including this concept at his disposal. Three hundred and one of Mahdi's believed 313 companions also are believed to have the knowledge of this concept.

In the Shia academia, this concept is a topic that can be seen widely studied by the likes of Ayatollah Marashi Najafi, Allameh Tabatabaei, and Mulla Sadra.

See also
   
Alchemy
Astronomy in Islam
Bilocation
Islamic astrology
Karamat
Kefitzat Haderech
Quantum mind
Teleportation
Shia Islam

References

External links
A discussion on the meaning of teleportation according to traditional Islamic philosophy, by Allama Tehrani    
Types of Tei al-ardh, by Allama Tehrani   from his book Shining Sun
The Shining Sun 
 Manuscripts on Tei al-ardh by Allameh Amini 

Islamic mysticism
Teleportation
Sufism
Sufi philosophy
Sufi psychology
Esoteric interpretation of the Quran
Islamic terminology